CMG may refer to:

Companies
 Capitol Music Group, a music label
 China Media Group, the predominant state radio and television broadcaster in the PRC
 China Media Group Co., Ltd., publicly listed Chinese holding company in the media sector
 Chipotle Mexican Grill, which trades on the NYSE as CMG
 Cinema Management Group, film sales company
 CMG (company), a telecommunications and IT consultancy company
 Collective Music Group, an American hip hop record label founded by Yo Gotti
 Computer Measurement Group, a worldwide non-profit organization of data processing professionals
 Computer Modelling Group, a producer of reservoir simulation software
 Concord Music Group, American independent music publisher
 Cool Math Games, an online browser game portal
 Cox Media Group, a broadcasting, publishing, direct marketing, digital media company
 EMI CMG (EMI Christian Music Group), a music label

Space
 Castor Moving Group, a moving group of stars sharing similar velocities
 Control moment gyroscope, orbital facility component

Other
 California men's gathering, an organization supporting the anti-sexist men's movement
 Caribbean guilder, a proposed currency in Curaçao and Sint Maarten
 Companion of the Order of St Michael and St George, a British and Commonwealth honour
 Corumbá International Airport (IATA airport code), Corumbá, Brazil